Thomas Rush (7 December 1874 – 29 October 1926) was an Australian cricketer. He played eight first-class cricket matches for Victoria between 1906 and 1908. His brother, Edward, also played for Victoria.

See also
 List of Victoria first-class cricketers

References

External links
 

1874 births
1926 deaths
Australian cricketers
Victoria cricketers
Cricketers from Melbourne